The election for Southwark London Borough Council took place on 3 May 2018, the same day as for other London Boroughs. All 63 seats were up for election.

New boundaries were used, using 23 two- and three-member wards (there were previously 21 three-member wards), following a Local Government Boundary Commission for England review that concluded in 2016. The review reflected demographic growth, shifting seats from the south of the borough to its northwest.

Results summary

Ward results

Borough & Bankside

Following ward boundary changes, this ward is made up of the northern two thirds of the former Cathedrals ward.

Camberwell Green

Champion Hill

Following ward boundary changes, this new ward is made up from the former ward of South Camberwell, but is significantly smaller.

Chaucer

Dulwich Hill

Following ward boundary changes, this ward is made up of parts of the former wards of East Dulwich, College and Peckham Rye.

Dulwich Village

Dulwich Wood

Following ward boundary changes, this ward was made up from the former ward of College, but is significantly smaller.

Faraday

Goose Green

 Following ward boundary changes, this ward was made up of half of East Dulwich and parts of South Camberwell, The Lane, Village and Peckham Rye wards.

London Bridge & West Bermondsey

Following ward boundary changes, this ward is made up of most of the former Grange ward, together with the western end of the former Riverside ward.

Newington
In May 2019, Coldwell resigned from Labour in opposition to the then leader Jeremy Corbyn and the parties stance on Brexit. He now sits as an Independent.

North Bermondsey

Following boundary changes, this ward is mostly made up of the former ward of Riverside, but also includes an area previously in Rotherhithe ward.

North Walworth

Nunhead & Queen's Road

Old Kent Road

Following ward boundary changes, this ward is made up of the former ward of Livesey, a small southern portion of the former ward of East Walworth and a small southern portion of South Bermondsey.

Peckham

Peckham Rye

Rotherhithe

Rye Lane

St George's

Following ward boundary changes, this ward was made up from the southern third of the former Cathedrals ward.

St Giles

South Bermondsey

Surrey Docks

References 

2018 London Borough council elections
2018
21st century in the London Borough of Southwark